SRHS may stand for:

San Rafael High School
Sanborn Regional High School
School of Related Health Sciences
Scripps Ranch High School
Sebastian River High School
Sharon Regional Health System
Shelburne Regional High School
Shore Regional High School
Slippery Rock High School, a high school in Slippery Rock Area School District
South River High School (Maryland)
South River High School (New Jersey)
Southern Regional High School
Spanish River Community High School
Spartanburg Regional Healthcare System
Sto-Rox High School
Southridge High School (disambiguation)
Sussex Regional High School